A Fire Has Been Arranged is a 1935 British comedy film directed by Leslie S. Hiscott and starring Chesney Allen, Bud Flanagan and Alastair Sim.

After a spell in prison three criminals return to recover their loot only to find the place where they have stashed it has been turned into a department store. They take jobs at the store in order to locate the whereabouts of their loot. The three discover that the unscrupulous managers of the store, Shuffle and Cutte, are keen to be accomplices in their plot.

It was made at Twickenham Studios. The film ends with the song Where the Arches Used To Be.

Cast
 Chesney Allen as Ches
 Bud Flanagan as Bud
 Hal Walters as Hal
 Harold French as Toby
 Mary Lawson as Betty
 Alastair Sim as Cutte
 C. Denier Warren as Shuffle
 Robb Wilton as Oswald
 Vincent Holman as Ex-detective
 Jack Vyvian as Prison Warder
 The Buddy Bradley Rhythm Girls as Shop Girls

References

Bibliography
 Sutton, David R. A chorus of raspberries: British film comedy 1929-1939. University of Exeter Press, 2000.

External links
 

1935 films
1935 comedy films
1930s English-language films
Films directed by Leslie S. Hiscott
Films shot at Twickenham Film Studios
British comedy films
Films set in England
British black-and-white films
1930s British films